McRaven was built c. 1797 by Andrew Glass in a town called Walnut Hills, which is now Vicksburg, Mississippi. In the Civil War era, it was known as the Bobb House, and it is listed on the National Register of Historic Places as such. McRaven got its current name from the street it is located on, which was formerly called McRaven Street, but is now Harrison Street. McRaven has been on the Mississippi Department of Archives and History's Historic Preservation list since January 8, 1978. It is also believed by many to be haunted, and has been called "the most haunted house in Mississippi."

History 
The first part of what is now McRaven was built by Andrew Glass ca. 1797 and originally serving as a way station for pioneers en route to Nashville, Tennessee along the Natchez Trace to the Mississippi River. As first built, McRaven consisted of only a kitchen with one room above it, this part of the house is now known as the "Pioneer Section".

In 1836, Sheriff Stephen Howard bought the house and added the middle dining room and the bedroom above it, built in Empire architectural style. Sheriff Howard's wife Mary Elizabeth Howard died during childbirth in late August, 1836 in the middle bedroom.

The house was purchased by John H. Bobb in 1849, Bobb built the rest of the house in Greek Revival style. During the Civil War's 1863 Siege of Vicksburg, McRaven was used as a Confederate field hospital and camp site. Since it was located so close to the railroad, a major point of battle, the house was battered by cannon blasts from both the Union and Confederate forces.  However, it still stands.

On May 18, 1864, after Vicksburg had fallen to Union forces, John Bobb noticed a group of six drunken Union occupation soldiers picking flowers from his garden. Outraged, Bobb promptly ordered them to leave immediately, the soldiers cursed at him and refused to leave, so John picked up a brick and threw it at them, knocking a sergeant to the ground. The soldiers left, vowing to burn down Bobb's house. Bobb then reported the incident to the Federal Commander of Vicksburg, Gen. Henry W. Slocum who dismissively said he would admonish those responsible. Upon returning to the gates of his home, Bobb was met by 25 Union troops who took him to Stout's Bayou, about 100 yards from the house, and fatally shot him in the back and face. Bobb's death was the first recorded act of violence perpetrated by Union troops after the Siege. John's widow Selina Bobb sold the house to a realtor in 1869, and moved to a family plantation outside of New Orleans, Louisiana called Sunnyside.

McRaven was eventually sold to William Murray in 1882. Murray and his wife Ellen Flynn raised four daughters and three sons in McRaven. William Murray died at the house in 1911, his wife Ellen died there in 1921, their daughter Ida died in 1946, and a son died in 1950, all in McRaven. From this point on, William's daughters Annie and Ella Murray, both unmarried, lived alone in the house with no modern conveniences aside from a telephone, and no contact with the outside world except their doctor, Walter Johnston. In 1960, Ella Murray died at the age of 81, and her sister Annie sold the house after moving to a nursing home. At this point, the house was in such disrepair that neighbors and nearby residents had no idea it existed. The upper story was completely overgrown with vines and the sisters had resorted to chopping up the antique furniture for firewood.

In 1960, McRaven was purchased by O.E. Bradway and with cosmetic restoration it was opened to the public for touring in 1961. The house was placed on the National Register of Historical Places on January 8, 1979 (https://www.apps.mdah.ms.gov/nom/prop/27689.pdf).  Later that year, Bradway sold McRaven and some of the furnishings to Charles and Sandra Harvey for $75,000.  After the spring pilgrimage, the Harvey's closed the house and took on a year long restoration at a cost near $100,000.  The restoration included such things as woodwork, rewiring, plumbing and plastering.  A master at plaster restorations, Mr. Little of Jackson took on the extraordinary task of plastering all the walls and ceilings and restoring the Greek Revival cornices and ceiling medallions.    Having samples of the original carpet from the John Bobb era, Mrs. Harvey found a company in Georgia to reproduce the carpet for the parlor, front entry, stairwell and upstairs front bedroom.  She also did extensive research on each period of the house to have authentic paint, wallpaper, fabrics and furnishings for the public.  The front and rear porch were in disrepair and had been roped off by Bradway.  Lincoln Brown with the Waterways Experimental Station rebuilt both front and rear porches.  While in the attic, Mr. Harvey discovered many rafters had been damaged from the Union's shelling and needed repair. The 1840 privy which was purchased by Bradway  from the Vick House  was also repaired. Once again ready for touring, the Vicksburg Sunday Post featured McRaven's spring pilgrimage open house in their April 6, 1980 issue. McRaven had been returned to her authentic glory.  Though the Harveys and their two children never lived in the house, they spent many nights in the Howard's bedroom protecting the home from vandals.  In 1984, The Harveys moved to Natchez and sold McRaven to Leyland French for $275,000. 
    
In 1984, Leyland French purchased McRaven and did further restoration, French was the first owner since the Murrays to reside in the house. Aside from a modern kitchen and bathroom in its basement, McRaven has remained largely unchanged since the 19th century. For this reason, McRaven was featured in the July 1963 issue of National Geographic Magazine which called it the "Time Capsule of the South."

In May 2007, owner Leyland French put McRaven up for sale for $1,750,000. 
In August 2015, Steven and Kendra Reed purchased the home. They reopened it for both historical and ghost tours.

Ghosts 
Adding to the legend of McRaven being haunted, at least five occupants have died inside the house, and former owner John Bobb was murdered just outside its premises.  It's also very likely that a few Confederate soldiers died on the property during the time it was used as a field hospital. Reports of ghostly activity are said to spread throughout the house, but the center of activity seems to be the middle bedroom upstairs, the room where Mary Elizabeth Howard (age 15) died during childbirth. Her ghost is believed to be responsible for the bedside lamp in this room, which has been reported to turn on and off, seemingly at will. In the time before Leyland French bought the house and started living there in 1984, the previous owners who didn't reside in the home, were frequently awakened by calls in the middle of the night telling them the lights at McRaven had come on. Mary Elizabeth's 
ghostly apparition has appeared on the house's flying wing staircase, and in the dining room. While handling Mary Elizabeth's wedding shawl, some people say it emits heat, while others claim it almost jumped out of their hands.

McRaven owner Leyland French once saw the ghost of former owner William Murray on the staircase, and after realizing who it was, and the fact that he is dead, a frightened French ran upstairs to the Bobb bedroom and locked the door. He later called a local Episcopal priest and had the house blessed. The spirits of Ella and Annie Murray are also said to roam the grounds of McRaven.

Notable tour guests
Among the thousands of visitors to McRaven since it opened for tours in 1961, are Max Baer, Jr. and Irene Ryan of the sitcom The Beverly Hillbillies, who toured the house in the mid-1960s—an autographed photo of them at the house hangs in the foyer of McRaven.

In the media

Television
The McRaven House was featured on an episode of Ghost Adventures entitled "Ghosts of Vicksburg: McRaven Mansion" that aired as a special in 2018 on the Travel Channel. The team of paranormal investigators explored the home and its grounds which was used as a Confederate campsite during the Civil War. They investigated reports of the aggressive ghost of Andrew Glass, a highwayman who was murdered by his jealous wife long ago.
YouTubers Sam and Colby also paid the site a visit in 2022.

References

External links
 Official Website of the McRaven Tour Home
 CBS News - Ghosts for Guests?
Mississippi Department of Archives and History

Vicksburg campaign
Reportedly haunted locations in Mississippi
Historic house museums in Mississippi
Museums in Warren County, Mississippi
Natchez Trace
Houses on the National Register of Historic Places in Mississippi
Houses completed in 1836
Buildings and structures in Vicksburg, Mississippi
Houses in Warren County, Mississippi
National Register of Historic Places in Warren County, Mississippi